Khan Kandi or Khankandi may refer to various places in Iran:
 Khan Kandi, Germi, Ardabil Province
 Khankandi, Meshgin Shahr, Ardabil Province
 Khan Kandi, Namin, Ardabil Province
 Khan Kandi, Ahar, East Azerbaijan Province
 Khan Kandi, Kaleybar, East Azerbaijan Province
 Khan Kandi, Kurdistan
 Khan Kandi, West Azerbaijan
 Khan Kandi, Chaldoran, West Azerbaijan Province

See also  
 Xankəndi (disambiguation)